LGBT in the Ottoman Empire was the practices, militancies and cultural assessments on sexual diversity that were historically deployed in the Ottoman Empire.

Terminology 

Chengi - young boy and girl dancers (prostitutes) 

Devshirme - the practice of gathering young “promising” boys from Christian families 

Hammam - bathouse

Serglios - women's apartments in The Ottoman Empire 

Signor - Sultan 

The Palace School - men's apartments in The Ottoman Empire 

Yenicheri - “new troops” whose ranks have been filled by the devshirme 

Yamak - volunteers for the devshirme 

Yenicheri - older soldiers who enjoyed pleasure from Yamak

The History of Decriminalization of Homosexuality in The Ottoman Empire

Pre-Decriminalization (1800-1858) 
Prior to 1858, Ottomans did not base sexual identities on attraction to a specific gender but distinguished between active and passive partners, often distinguished as "the lover" and "the beloved". Therefore, choice of a partner was merely based on taste and not on sexual identity. However, marriage between a man and a woman was the only acceptable form of a legitimized relationship. Thus making it illegal for people to openly have relationships with partners of the same sex. If one were to express a homosexual relationship in public, society would retaliate in exclusion.

Decriminalization (1858) 
In 1858, the Ottoman society constructed a reform to their penal code that was fairly similar to the 1810 French Penal Code. The 1858 Ottoman Penal Code stated the following:

Art. 202—The person who dares to commit the abominable act publicly contrary to modesty and sense of shame is to be imprisoned for from three months to one year and a fine of from one Mejidieh gold piece to ten Mejidieh gold pieces is to be levied (Penal Code of the Ottoman Empire,1858).

This statement is a translation from Article 330 of the French Penal Code which also decriminalizes homosexuality. Such a statement only partially decriminalizes homosexuality, making it legal for private same sex relationships while still holding public homosexual relationships to be unacceptable.

During this period of time, it is speculated that most homosexual relationships took place behind closed doors. In private hammams and mosques, individuals were free to express their feelings and emotions in a comfortable safe space. However, once an individual left that safe space, the acts one indulged in were not permitted to be spoken of in society.

Post Decriminalization (1858-1900s) 
By the late 19th century homosexual contact started to decline and the focus of desire turned to young girls. Ahmet Cevdet Pasha stated: "Woman-lovers have increased in number, while boy-beloveds have decreased. It is as if the People of Lot have been swallowed by the earth. The love and affinity that were, in Istanbul, notoriously and customarily directed towards young men have now been redirected towards girls, in accordance with the state of nature." Research shows that the decline is in close relationship to the criminalization of homosexuality in the Western world, which followed repression of the queer community.

Homosexuality Among the Ottoman Elite 

The 18th century atmosphere of the Ottoman Empire was surrounded by the excitement of pleasure. While homosexuality was engaged in frequently, the actual practice of living as a homosexual was kept private in society. As a result, there is more evidence gathered on the practice of Ottoman homosexual relations within pederasty.

Same sex love in the Ottoman Empire was widely practiced as an activity that older men would engage in by utilizing a system that granted confidentiality. Due to society's opinion and disregard of living as a homosexual, Ottoman society turned towards the act of pederasty as a way to engage in their desires. This pederasty often involved an older individual with a young [youthful] boy or girl. In such a situation, the relationship involved a “lover” and a “beloved”. The role of the beloved was taken on by the youthful individual who was often gendered as un-masculine, encompassed in femininity.

At the time of the 18th century, the elite in Ottoman society created a system where they were able to generate armies and partake in homosexuality. The Sultan’s armies received masses of yamak  (volunteers) that wanted the privileges of being a part of the system, especially the exemption from taxes. The yamak, while being trained and schooled, were also expected to be enjoyed by the yenicheri (soldiers). The yamak are described to have been housed separated by gender where the Sultan was in charge of regulating the daily living and learning conditions of the children. Benedetto Ramberti (Venetian envoy) described the system inside these houses explaining in detail that “there are about five hundred youths aged from eight to twenty years, who reside in the palace and are the delight of Signor… They never leave the aforesaid palace until they have reached the age when the Signor thinks them fit for offices… Each ten of them is guarded by a eunuch called Kapu-oghlan [gate-youth], and each has a slave’s frock, in which he sleeps rolled up in such a manner that he does not touch another who may be near him.” The young yamak inside the palace school experienced living in a single sex environment and were greatly discouraged from engaging in heterosexuality. Once they grew into a mature age, the Sultan granted their graduation and they went on to live on as a soldier.

Homosexuality in Ottoman Culture

Famous 18th Century Ottoman Poets 
The adult homosexuality community during Ottoman Empire has no true accounts on how same sex relationships were practiced. However, Ottoman lyric poetry has given insight to how individuals felt about same sex relationships.

The poet Ahmed Nedîm Efendi wrote beautiful pieces describing how he felt towards men. In one piece he wrote -

“The learned are all enamored of boys,

Not one remains who female love enjoys.” - Nedîm 

In this statement he is explaining that those in Ottoman society who opened up to their feelings of homosexuality have grown to be wiser and understanding of their emotions towards the same sex.  Another poet by the name of İsa Necati wrote a line entailing intimate details of two partners engaging in sex.

“When the rose [anus] holds carnival,

The tulip’s [vagina] smartly shown the door.” - Necati 

A notable mention as well to the Ottoman poet named Enderûnlu Fâzıl, who thoroughly expressed his homosexuality through his own literature. In one of his Ottoman pieces, Zenanname, he describes a love story between two men inside the Palace School and their lives in the Ottoman empire.

Ottoman poets were more open to writing about same sex love due to interpretation being loosely understood. Many scholars today still deny the idea that these Ottoman poets were describing a homosexual relationship. However, looking closely towards at these poet’s words it is greatly expressed that intellectual, spiritual, and erotic relationships were far more possible to experience with a male according to their understanding of the matter.

Hamse-yi ‘Atā’ī 

Nev'izade Atayi was an Ottoman poet of the 18th century who wrote beautiful manuscripts detailing stories of moralities, trites, and same-sex relationships. In his manuscript titled Hamse he uncovers major themes regarding the Ottoman Empire. The poems detail stories encompassing parties inside the Imperial Court, social values of the century, moral and ethical codes, and same sex relationships. It is in the fourth part of Hamse where the story follows two young men and their travels around Istanbul. As the two young male characters are traveling by sea to Egypt, they are captured and enslaved by European soldiers. While they are enslaved, the European kidnappers fall in love with their prisoners.

The story is one of the only surviving texts where homosexuality among men is clearly displayed and celebrated. It is a tale that becomes seemingly beautiful, as men are shown in a different light of being able to love a partner of their same sex.

See also 
 History of human sexuality
 LGBT history in Turkey
 LGBT rights in Turkey

References 

Ottoman Empire
Social history of Turkey
Ottoman Empire
LGBT history in Asia
History
LGBT and Islam